Mihai Poiată (born December 4, 1949, Cojuşna) is a Moldovan politician.

Biography 

He served as member of the Parliament of Moldova.

References

External links 
 Cine au fost şi ce fac deputaţii primului Parlament din R. Moldova (1990-1994)? 
 Declaraţia deputaţilor din primul Parlament 
 Site-ul Parlamentului Republicii Moldova

Living people
Moldovan MPs 1990–1994
Popular Front of Moldova MPs
1949 births
Recipients of the Order of Honour (Moldova)